Salem Center is an unincorporated community in Meigs County, in the U.S. state of Ohio.

History
A post office called Salem Centre was established in 1856. Salem Center once had its own schoolhouse.

References

Unincorporated communities in Meigs County, Ohio
Unincorporated communities in Ohio